Nicolas Moutton (born 15 January 1986) is a French rower. He competed in the Men's lightweight coxless four event at the 2012 Summer Olympics.

References

External links
 

1986 births
Living people
French male rowers
Olympic rowers of France
Rowers at the 2012 Summer Olympics
People from Thonon-les-Bains
Sportspeople from Haute-Savoie